James Malcolm Clark Ford (29 December 1936 — 13 April 1987) was a Scottish first-class cricketer.

The son of the cricketer Alexander Ford, he was born at Edinburgh in December 1936. He was educated at the Edinburgh Academy. A club cricketer for West Lothian Cricket Club, Ford made his debut for Scotland in first-class cricket against Ireland at Paisley in 1960. He played first-class cricket for Scotland until 1966, making ten appearances. In these matches, he scored a total of 235 runs at an average of 18.07; he made one half century, a score of 50 against Ireland in 1961. Besides playing, Ford scored in a match between Scotland and Warwickshire in 1965. Outside of cricket he was employed as a sales representative. Toward the end of his life, Ford struggled with alcoholism and succumbed to its effects in April 1987. His brother was the footballer Donald Ford.

References

External links
 

1936 births
1987 deaths
Cricketers from Edinburgh
People educated at Edinburgh Academy
Scottish cricketers
Cricket scorers
Alcohol-related deaths in Scotland